The 2009 AIBA World Boxing Championships were held in Milan, Italy, from September 1, 2009 to September 12, 2009, in the Mediolanum Forum. It was the biggest World Championships in AIBA history. The competition was under the supervision of the world's governing body for amateur boxing, the AIBA.

Originally, Cameroon, Trinidad and Tobago and Uzbekistan each expressed interest in hosting the championships. However, they did not submit a final application and were therefore withdrawn from the running. This left Italy and South Korea remaining, who were the final two countries in contention during the bidding process to host the 2009 championships. The city of Milan in Italy was then chosen to host the competition.

Medal table

Medal summary

See also
 World Amateur Boxing Championships

References

External links
Official Games website

 
World Amateur Boxing Championships
Boxing Championships
Sports competitions in Milan
AIBA World Boxing Championships
International boxing competitions hosted by Italy
September 2009 sports events in Europe
2000s in Milan